The CONCACAF Men's Olympic Qualifying Championship was a quadrennial, international, age-restricted football tournament organized by CONCACAF to determine which men's under-23 national teams from the North, Central America and Caribbean region qualify for the Olympic football tournament. The competition format had varied since its inception, from 1996 to the final edition in 2020 it had been hosted in a single country.

On 16 September 2021, CONCACAF announced that the representatives at the 2024 Summer Olympic Games will qualify through the 2022 CONCACAF U-20 Championship.  The two finalists at the Concacaf U20 tournament will qualify for the Olympics in 2024.

Past tournaments
Note: The 1960 tournament is a combined tournament of South and North American teams, and not counted by CONCACAF.

Top goalscorers by year 

1964
 Carl Gentile (4 goals)
 Aaron Padilla (4 goals)

1968
 Juan Ramon Martinez (3 goals)

1972

 Leonard Cuellar (4 goals)
 Mike Seeray (4 goals)
1976

 Hugo Sanchez (4 goals)

1980

 Don Ebert (3 goals)
 Javier Jimenez (3 goals)

1984

 Mike Sweeney (2 goals)
1988 
 Brent Goulet (6 goals)

1992
 Steve Snow (8 goals)

1996

 Ronald Gomez (6 goals)

2000

 Chris Albright (2 goals)
 Josh Wolff (2 goals)
 Joaquin Beltran (2 goals)
 Carlos Ruiz (2 goals)
 David Suazo (2 goals)

2004

 Alecko Eskandarian
 Bobby Convey
 Emil Martinez

2008

 Freddy Adu (4 goals)

2012

 Marco Fabian (5 goals)
 Alan Pulido (5 goals)

2015

 Alberth Elis (4 goals)
 Jerome Kiesewetter (4 goals)

2020

 Sebastián Córdova (4 goals)

Overall top goalscorers

Winners by country

Olympic qualification by nation
 As of 2024

Curacao have been expelled by IOC, but participant record is recognized by FIFA.

References

External links
 CONCACAF Men’s Olympic Qualifying

 
Oly
Defunct international association football competitions in North America
Football qualification for the Summer Olympics
Recurring sporting events established in 1956
Recurring events disestablished in 2021
1956 establishments in North America
2021 disestablishments in North America